Radoslavov (Bulgarian: Радославов) is a Bulgarian masculine surname, its feminine counterpart is Radoslavova. It may refer to
Tsvetan Radoslavov (1863–1931), Bulgarian teacher and author of national anthem
Vasil Radoslavov (1854–1929), Bulgarian liberal politician 

Bulgarian-language surnames
Patronymic surnames
Surnames from given names